Tallula No. 11 Precinct is located in Menard County, Illinois. The population was 816 at the 2000 census.

External links 
US Census
Illinois State Archives

Precincts in Menard County, Illinois
Springfield metropolitan area, Illinois